The Central Library is the main library of the Kansas City Public Library system, which is located in the Library District of Downtown Kansas City, Missouri, United States. It is situated at 14 West 10th Street, at the corner of West 10th Street and Baltimore Avenue, across Baltimore Avenue from the Kansas City Club and up from the New York Life Building. It contains the administration of Kansas City's library system.

Within the Central Library, the Missouri Valley Room contains a wide collection of items related to Kansas City local history, including original and published materials, news articles, postcards, photographs, maps, and directories dating from the city's earliest history.  The Library's Ramos Collection includes books, pamphlets, journal articles, and other materials relating to African-American history and culture.

References

External links

 
 Libraries.org | https://librarytechnology.org/library/1072

Buildings and structures in Kansas City, Missouri
Education in Kansas City, Missouri
Kansas City metropolitan area
Libraries on the National Register of Historic Places in Missouri
Library buildings completed in 1895
Public libraries in Missouri
National Register of Historic Places in Kansas City, Missouri
Library District (Kansas City, Missouri)